T Tower is an office building located in San Isidro, Lima, Peru.

Construction began in 2015 at a cost of over S/.115 million and the building was inaugurated in 2018, has a height of 101 meters corresponding to the line of the façade and has 24 floors and a semi-covered rooftop. It is located in front of Javier Prado avenue in the corporate centre of San Isidro.

See also
List of tallest buildings in Peru

References

Buildings and structures in Lima
Buildings and structures completed in 2018
2018 in Peru